Reed House is a historic home located at Leipsic, Kent County, Delaware.  It dates to the first quarter of the 19th century, and is a two-story, three bay, gable roofed timber-frame vernacular dwelling.  It has a later one-story frame extending wing from the east gable end.  The front facade features a plain tetra-style front porch with squared supports and a shed roof.

It was listed on the National Register of Historic Places in 1983.

References

External links

Houses on the National Register of Historic Places in Delaware
Houses in Kent County, Delaware
Historic American Buildings Survey in Delaware
National Register of Historic Places in Kent County, Delaware
Leipsic, Delaware